James Austin may refer to:

Sports
 Jim Austin (baseball) (born 1963), former baseball pitcher
 Jim Austin (rugby league), New Zealand rugby league player
 James Austin (judoka) (born 1983), English judoka
 James Austin (American football) (1913–1995), American football player
 Jimmy Austin (1879–1965), British-American baseball player and coach

Others
 James Austin (businessman) (1813–1897), Canadian businessman in Toronto
 James Austin (musician) (born 1937), American trumpeter and pedagogue
 James Austin (photographer) (born 1940), Australian fine-art and architectural photographer
 James E.B. Austin (1803–1829), Texan settler and brother of Stephen F. Austin, "The Father of Texas"
 James H. Austin, American neurologist, Zen Buddhist, and writer
 James Murdoch Austin (1915–2000), New Zealand-American meteorologist and mathematician
 James T. Austin (1784–1870), 22nd Massachusetts Attorney General
 James W. Austin (1829–1895), Justice of the Supreme Court of the Kingdom of Hawaii

See also